The 2006 RLIF Awards were presented on Monday 20 November 2006. The separate Rugby League World Golden Boot Award were incorporated into the proceedings.

External links
 Rugby League International Federation
 RLIF Official forums

RLIF Awards
RLIF Awards
RLIF Awards